4LG is an Australian radio station serving the Longreach region owned and operated by Resonate Broadcasting. It was opened in May 1936.

References

Radio stations in Queensland
Radio stations established in 1936
Classic hits radio stations in Australia
Resonate Broadcasting
1936 establishments in Australia